The men's 3000 metres steeplechase at the 2010 European Athletics Championships was held at the Estadi Olímpic Lluís Companys on 30 July and 1 August.

Frenchmen Mahiedine Mekhissi-Benabbad and Bouabdellah Tahri took the gold and silver medals, respectively. The initial bronze medallist José Luis Blanco was later stripped of his medal as he had given a positive drugs test at the Spanish championships in July. Ion Luchianov of Moldova was elevated to the bronze medal.

Medalists

Records

Schedule

Results

Round 1

Heat 1

Heat 2

Summary

Final

References
 Round 1 Results
 Final Results
Full results

Steeplechase 3000
Steeplechase at the European Athletics Championships